The following people are children of U.S. vice presidents, including stepchildren and alleged illegitimate children. Currently there are 42 confirmed, known living vice presidential children, the oldest Ann Rockefeller Roberts, the youngest Ella Emhoff. Two vice presidential children, John Quincy Adams and George W. Bush, have become president.

18th century

John and Abigail Adams

19th century

Thomas Jefferson

with Martha Jefferson 

 Martha Jefferson also had one son with her first husband Bathurst Skelton, who died before her marriage to Jefferson:
1. John Skelton (November 7, 1767 – June 10, 1771)

with Sally Hemings 
 Children with Sally Hemings; see Jefferson DNA data

Thomas Woodson, the father of Lewis Woodson and Sarah Jane Woodson, was also claimed to be a child of Thomas Jefferson and Sally Hemings. However, DNA testing of the male Jefferson line and the male Woodson line showed no link.

Aaron Burr

with Theodosia Bartow Prevost 

Burr also had numerous adopted children and stepchildren:

Burr had numerous illegitimate children, as well:

with Mary Emmons

with unknown mistress

George and Sarah Cornelia Clinton

Elbridge and Ann Gerry

Daniel and Hannah Tompkins

John and Floride Calhoun

Martin and Hannah Van Buren

Richard Mentor Johnson

with unknown fiancée

with Julia Chinn Johnson

John Tyler

with Letitia Tyler

alleged child with a slave

with Julia Tyler

George M. and Sophia Dallas

Millard and Abigail Fillmore

John C. and Mary Cyrene Burch Breckinridge

Hannibal Hamlin

with Sarah Hamlin

with Ellen Hamlin

Andrew and Eliza McCardle Johnson

Schuyler and Ellen Maria Colfax

Henry and Harriet Wilson

Chester A. and Nell Arthur

Thomas A. and Eliza Hendricks

Levi P. Morton

with Lucy Morton

with Anna Morton

Adlai and Letitia Stevenson

Garret and Jennie Tuttle Hobart

20th century

Theodore Roosevelt

with Alice Roosevelt

with Edith Roosevelt

Charles W. and Cornelia Cole Fairbanks

James S. and Carrie Babcock Sherman

Thomas R. and Lois Irene Marshall

Calvin and Grace Coolidge

Charles and Caro Dawes

Charles and Annie Baird Curtis 

He and his wife also provided a home in Topeka for his paternal half-sister Dolly Curtis before her marriage.

John Nance and Mariette Rheiner Garner

Henry and Ilo Wallace

Harry S. and Bess Truman

Alben W. and Dorothy Barkley

Barkley's second wife Jane Hadley Barkley had two daughters with her first husband Carleton Sturdavant Hadley before her marriage to Barkley. They were Annette Hadley Behrend (born March 25, 1932) and Jane Everett Hadley Perry (born December 21, 1934).

Richard and Pat Nixon

Lyndon and Lady Bird Johnson

Hubert and Muriel Buck Humphrey

Spiro and Judy Agnew

Gerald and Betty Ford

Nelson Rockefeller

with Mary Todhunter Clark

with Happy Rockefeller

Happy Rockefeller also had four children with her first husband James Slater Murphy before her marriage to Rockefeller: James B. Murphy, II, Margaretta Harrison Murphy, Carol Slater Murphy, and Malinda Fitler Murphy (1960–2005).

Walter and Joan Mondale

George H. W. and Barbara Bush

Dan and Marilyn Quayle

21st century

Al and Tipper Gore

Dick and Lynne Cheney

Joe Biden

with Neilia Hunter Biden

with Jill Biden

Mike and Karen Pence

Kamala Harris and Doug Emhoff 
Kamala Harris is a stepmother to Doug Emhoff's two children from his previous marriage to the film producer Kerstin Emhoff. The two Emhoff children call Harris 'Momala'.

Living vice presidential children 
In order of their ages, they are:

The most recent vice presidential child to die was Robert Andrew Humphrey, the second son and third child of Hubert Humphrey, who died on April 6, 2018, at the age of 74.

See also
List of children of presidents of the United States

References

Children
Vice Presidents of the United States

Children by occupation of parent